Dehleez is a 1981 Pakistani television series which aired on PTV.

Written by Amjad Islam Amjad, it featured Roohi Bano, Mahboob Alam, Uzma Gillani and Tahira Naqvi among others. The serial was directed by Yawar Hayat Khan and assisted by Qambar Ali Shah, Kunwar Aftab Ahmed and Nusrat Thakur. The drama serial is one of the most famous dramas from PTV. It is remembered to this day due to its unique storyline and huge star cast. The drama is considered a cult classic and is one of the rarest gems of PTV. It was re-aired on the 50th anniversary of PTV in 2014.

Cast 
 Roohi Bano
 Uzma Gillani
 Qavi Khan
 Afzaal Ahmad
 Mahboob Alam
 Tahira Naqvi
 Agha Sikandar
 Arifa Siddiqui
 Aurangzeb Leghari
 Firdous Jamal
 Asif Raza Mir
 Khayyam Sarhadi
 Abid Kashmiri
 Mona Siddiqui
 Najma Mehboob
 Badi Uz Zaman
 Ghayyur Akhtar
 Jamil Fakhri
 Mehmood Akhter
 Tauqeer Nasir
 Irfan Hashmi
 Ayub Khan
 Tashqeen
 Fakhri Ahmed
 Talat Siddiqui
 Mohammad Zubair

References

External links
Dehleez TV drama on YouTube

Pakistani drama television series
Urdu-language television shows
Pakistan Television Corporation original programming
Television shows set in Karachi